Rabbi Joseph Shapotshnick (1882–1937) was a Jewish social activist in early-20th century London.

Biography

Shapotshnick was born in Kishinev. Shapotshnick's father, Yehuda Leib Shapotshnick, was a Hasidic leader in Kishinev, known as the Belsitzer Rebbe. After his death in 1896, the young Shapotshnick and his mother moved to Odessa, where he studied at the local university and under Dayan Abraham Joel Abelson. Shapotshnick moved to the East End of London in 1913; from then until his death, he was embroiled in numerous controversies, both within and beyond the Anglo-Jewish community. A prolific author of numerous self-published books, pamphlets, newspapers and journals, Shapotshnick published in 1908 an 80-page treatise on the kabbalistic meanings of the name of God, entitled "Kedushas H-Shem". His most famous publication, "Shass ha-gadol she-bi-gedolim," was published in 1919. It consisted of one volume of the Talmud—tractate Berakhot—and was the largest rabbinic book ever published.

Shapotshnick was regarded as a miracle worker, reportedly curing a number of sick people, Jews and non-Jews. In 1928, he attracted headlines by sending an herbal remedy to King George V. He gave two-thirds of his income to charity.

The Agunot scandal

From the mid-1920s, Shapotshnick offered to help agunot — women whose inability to gain a Jewish divorce meant that they could not remarry — to find ways of resolving their problems. It is not clear whether any of the women he helped ever remarried, but there were serious concerns that his dispensations for them to do so were faulty, potentially meaning that their offspring from a second marriage would be considered mamzerim (bastards) under Jewish ritual law. In 1927, the head of the London bet din, Rabbi Shmuel Yitzchak Hillman sought help from the Chofetz Chaim and other prominent rabbis to stop Shapotshnick from issuing spurious dispensations. In the ensuing controversy, it was discovered that Shapotshnick had falsely added the names of various colleagues to dispensations, effectively forging their support without consent. Those rabbis disassociated themselves from him publicly by writing to the Yiddish press in London and urging the publication of their letters of condemnation. In late 1928, the rabbinical association of Poland published a booklet containing 600 signatures of rabbis condemning Shapotshnick and his activities. He was declared bankrupt in November 1932.

Other activities

Shapotshnick was a persistent critic of the Anglo-Jewish establishment's mistreatment of the poor immigrants who lived mainly in the East End. He criticised the lack of interest in the welfare and education of immigrant Jews, and at various times set up his own educational establishments, and more controversially, his own kosher supervision authority. In the spring of 1937, it was discovered that 8 of the 11 butcher shops under his supervision were selling 'kosher' meat bought from non-Jewish wholesalers. One of the butchers was taken to court for the crime of misrepresentation and was eventually convicted and fined. Shapotshnick died quite suddenly during the trial and was never questioned in court about his role, although it was widely suspected that he was out of his depth rather than maliciously negligent.

He was sufficiently respected in official circles to be invited to an official reception at Lancaster House in honour of the International Congress of Faiths.

Shapotshnick's funeral

Shapotshnick died suddenly on Thursday, 21 October 1937 in London, England. At first no one would agree to bury him because of his controversial reputation. Eventually, the newly established Adath Yisrael community agreed to inter him at their Enfield cemetery, after the imposition of various conditions on his only son, Levi.

Shapotshnick's funeral took place on Monday, 25 October 1937. Despite the pouring rain, 5,000 people attended his funeral. The crowd was almost exclusively drawn from the common folk of the East End Jewish community, who were mostly unaffected by his controversial episodes, but who saw him as a fighter for their cause and a charismatic religious leader.

References

 Jewish Chronicle, Nov 28 1930 p. 29; Feb 23 1934 p. 11; Oct 29 1937 p. 8, p. 13, p. 15; Nov 5 1937 p. 25
 The Palgrave Dictionary of Anglo-Jewish History (2011) 

1882 births
1937 deaths
Agunot
British human rights activists
British Jewish writers
British Orthodox rabbis
Jewish English history
Date of death missing
Date of birth missing